Sonja Castelein (born 10 June 1954) is a Belgian middle-distance runner. She competed in the women's 1500 metres at the 1976 Summer Olympics.

References

1954 births
Living people
Athletes (track and field) at the 1976 Summer Olympics
Belgian female middle-distance runners
Olympic athletes of Belgium
Place of birth missing (living people)